Li Hualin (born October 1962) is a Chinese oil and gas executive, and former deputy general manager of China National Petroleum Corporation and PetroChina. Li has over 30 years of experience in the oil and gas industry in China. He spent 25 years in state-owned China National Petroleum Corporation, having worked in the United States, Canada, and Kazakhstan. He also at one point served as Zhou Yongkang's secretary.

In August 2013, Li came under investigation for corruption and was dismissed from his positions.

Career
Li was born in Tianmen, Hubei, with his ancestral home in Nanyang. In July 1983 he graduated from Southwest Petroleum University, majoring in geophysical prospecting. He earned his master of management degree from China University of Petroleum in December 2002.

After graduating from Southwest Petroleum University, he was assigned to the Ministry of Petroleum Industry of the People's Republic of China as an officer, he worked there until March 1987.

Beginning in 1987, he served in several posts in China National Petroleum Corporation, including deputy director, secretary, and general manager. In 1988, while Li was sent to work in the United States, he escorted Zhou Bin, son of Zhou Yongkang, to study in the United States.

In March 1992, Li was promoted to CNPC's Houston office in the United States as its deputy head.

In December 1997, Li became the Deputy General Manager of the China National Oil and Gas Exploration Development Corporation and the Chairman and General Manager of CNPC International (Canada) Ltd.

In September 1999, Li became the General Manager of CNPC International (Kazakhstan) Ltd, he also served as the Deputy General Manager of the China National Oil and Gas Exploration and Development Corporation.

In January 2001, Li became the Deputy General Manager of China Petroleum Hong Kong (Holding) Limited.

In December 2001, Li was appointed as the Chairman of Shenzhen Petroleum Industrial Co., Ltd.

From July 2006, Li became the Vice-Chairman and General Manager of China Petroleum Hong Kong (Holding) Limited, he also served as the Chairman of Shenzhen Petroleum Industrial Co., Ltd.

In November 2007, Li became the Vice-President of China National Petroleum Corporation, a position he held until May 2009, when he was appointed the Board Chairman of China National Petroleum Corporation.

In July 2013, Li was promoted to become the Deputy General Manager of China National Petroleum Corporation and PetroChina Company Limited, he also served as the Board Chairman of Kunlun Energy Company Limited. When he was the Board Chairman of Kunlun Energy Company Limited, he used his powers made hundreds of millions of RMB.

Downfall
On August 27, 2013, Li was being investigated by the Central Commission for Discipline Inspection of the Communist Party of China for "serious violations of laws and regulations".

References

1962 births
Living people
People's Republic of China politicians from Hubei
Politicians from Tianmen
Political office-holders in Hubei
Chinese Communist Party politicians from Hubei